Lieutenant-General Charles Alan 'Pop' Fraser   (6 April 1915 – 18 December 1994) was a South African military commander.  He joined the South African Army as a part-time Active Citizen Force soldier in 1934 and became a full-time Permanent Force member in 1946.  He served in World War II.

With the rank of captain, he completed the 5th Senior Staff Duties War course at the British Middle East Staff College, Haifa in Palestine during period 8 September - 31 December 1941.
During World War II, the Cape Field Artillery was amalgamated with the 6th Field Regiment, South African Artillery, in September 1943. On 1 October 1943 became 1/6 Field Regiment.  Fraser, as a lieutenant-colonel assumed command of this regiment on 21 October 1944 when Lt-Col Kay, officer commanding, died of wounds.  Fraser was in turn succeeded by Lt-Col IB Whyte.

He served as Chief of the Army from 1966 to 1967, and as General Officer Commanding Joint Combat Forces, co-ordinating Army and Air Force operations and training, from 1967 to 1973.  As GOCJCF, he was the third-highest-ranking officer in the South African Defence Force's Supreme Command.

Awards and decorations

See also 

 List of South African military chiefs
 South African National Defence Force

References 

1915 births
1994 deaths
South African people of British descent
White South African people
Chiefs of the South African Army
South African military personnel of World War II
Western Desert campaign
Ambassadors of South Africa to Iran